The All Olympia Gymnastics Center or AOGC is a one-facility gymnastics gym in Calabasas.

The head coaches are 1983 World Vault Champion Artur Akopyan and 1980 Olympian Galina Marinova. Their notable elite gymnasts are 2012 Olympic Champion McKayla Maroney, 2010 World Team Member Mattie Larson and Stanford Cardinal Samantha Shapiro.

History 

AOGC has had numerous successes at National Level as well as on the International stage, representing Team USA.

AOGC is owned by former Olympic gymnast Galina Marinova and World Champion/Olympian Artur Akopyan. Many of their gymnasts have gotten scholarships to major university’s, competed in the world championships, and Olympics. 

In 2010, AOGC had a new member, Junior elite gymnast McKayla Maroney transferred from Gym-Max Gymnastics in Costa Mesa. McKayla competed at the U.S Nationals, placing 3rd in the all-around and winning the Vault. Mattie Larson won the floor at the U.S Nationals and was named to the U.S 2010 World Gymnastics Championships team. 

In 2011, Samantha Shapiro ended her elite career, going into Collegiate gymnastics, for UCLA and Stanford. Meanwhile, Maroney was named to the U.S Worlds Squad. She took the team gold and also won the World title on the Vault.

In 2012, McKayla was named to the U.S Olympic Squad. Injured in the leadup to the Olympics, Maroney competed only on her best event, vault. She competed a near-flawless vault during team finals and later won the silver medal on vault.

In 2013, Maroney took the U.S National titles on Floor and Vault and was later named to the 2013 Worlds Squad. She won a gold medal for vault.

Notable Gymnasts & Alumni 
McKayla Maroney
 2012 Olympic Team gold medalist, vault silver medalist
 2013 World Vault Champion
 2011 World Team and Vault Champion
 2010 Pan American Team, Vault, and Floor Exercise Champion

Mohini Bhardwaj
 2004 Olympic Team silver medalist
 2001 World Team bronze medalist
 2001 Pan American Team Champion and All-Around silver medalist
 UCLA Bruin

Mattie Larson 
 2010 World Team Silver Medalist
 2007 Junior Pan American Team, All-Around, and Floor Champion, Uneven bars silver medalist
 UCLA Bruin (2012–14)

Samantha Shapiro
 National Team Member (2006–11)
 Stanford Cardinal (2012–15)

Veronica Hults
 National Team Member (2013) 

Alaina Kwan
 Belarusian National Team member
 Kentucky Wildcats

Kylie Dickson
 Belarusian National Team member
 Competed for Belarus at the 2016 Summer Olympics
 Alabama Crimson Tide

References

External links
 

 
Sports venues in Los Angeles County, California
Gymnastics clubs in the United States